Gaurav Tiwari was a paranormal investigator, UFO field investigator and ParaNexus representative in India who appeared on television shows such as MTV Girl's Night Out with Rannvijay Singh, Haunted Weekends with Sunny Leone, Aaj Tak, Live India, News 24, Star TV, Zee TV, Fear Files: Darr Ki Sacchi Tasvirein, Syfy's 'Haunting: Australia', and Sony TV's Bhoot Aaya. Tiwari was also a guest on paranormal radio shows and CEO and Founder of the Indian Paranormal Society.

Early life 

Tiwari was an ordained minister of Metaphysical Church of Humanistic Science. He made cameo appearances in the Hindi films 16 December and Tango Charlie. At the age of 21, he went to Florida to pursue his career at aviation, and later became interested in Paranormal investigation and Parapsychology.

Career 

Tiwari appeared on MTV Girls Night Out directed by Sajeed A. This show was India's first horror/paranormal reality show and it also won the Best Reality Show in Asian Television Awards, Singapore, 2011. A similar show/repeat was Haunted weekends with Sunny Leone.

Bhoot Aaya
Tiwari appeared as a paranormal expert and lead investigator in Bhoot Aaya describing the alleged paranormal activity.

Haunting: Australia
Tiwari appeared in the SyFy series Haunting: Australia along with fellow ghost hunters Robb Demarest, Ian Lawman, Ray Jordan, Rayleen Kable and Allen Tiller.

MTV He Ticket
Tiwari appeared as a mentor in one of the episodes of MTV He Ticket where he guided the contestants at Bhangarh Fort.

Death 
Tiwari was found dead of asphyxiation at his Dwarka home on July 7, 2016 at the age of 32, prompting speculation in various media by fans and paranormal enthusiasts that his death was caused by vengeful spirits, however, following an autopsy, Delhi Police determined that Tiwari committed suicide by hanging himself inside his bathroom and that his death did not involve any foul play. According to Surender Kumar, DCP (South-West), “It is a clear case of suicide. He hanged himself in the bathroom using his wife’s dupatta on Thursday night”. Police investigating his death said that Tiwari "had no major projects lined up for the future" and what projects he had "brought in little money, but it was barely enough". This led to frequent disagreements with his family, and according to police, "his family, in fact, wanted him to take up a conventional job".

References

External links 
 Erasing the Fear of Paranormal, The New Indian Express.
 India's Most Haunted, National Geographic Magazine.
 Delhi and Paranormal Research, Hindustan Times, 3 March 2012.
 Ghost Hunters at Work, The Times of India, 6 March 2011.
 Gaurav Tiwari's articles on ParaNexus

1984 births
Male actors from New Delhi
Indian male television actors
20th-century Indian male actors
Commercial aviators
Paranormal investigators
People from Patna
2016 deaths
Suicides by hanging in India